Lucas Bloodoff (born May 5, 1989) is a Canadian professional ice hockey player currently an unrestricted free agent who last played for the Elmira Jackals of the ECHL.

Undrafted Bloodoff played collegiately for Saint Mary's University in the Atlantic conference of Canadian Interuniversity Sport (CIS). For his outstanding play during the 2012–13 season, Bloodoff was selected as the 2012-13 Canadian Interuniversity Sport player of the year, and was awarded the Senator Joseph A. Sullivan Trophy. On June 18, 2014, Bloodoff embarked on his professional career by signing a one-year contract with Elmira Jackals of the ECHL.

Family
His younger brother, Evan Bloodoff (born November 21, 1990), has played professional hockey in both the ECHL and American Hockey League.

Awards and honours

References

External links

1989 births
Adirondack Flames players
Canadian ice hockey left wingers
Elmira Jackals (ECHL) players
Ice hockey people from British Columbia
Living people
Kelowna Rockets players
Saint Mary's Huskies ice hockey players
Sportspeople from Castlegar, British Columbia
Universiade medalists in ice hockey
Canadian expatriate ice hockey players in the United States
Universiade gold medalists for Canada
Competitors at the 2013 Winter Universiade